Kitten Sanctuary is the first iOS game of British indie developer Clockwork Pixels, and was released on 27 March 2012.

Critical reception
The game has a Metacritic score of 85% based on 4 critic reviews.

SlideToPlay wrote "Not every game needs to be about guns or swords, and Kitten Sanctuary is a great alternative to the violence that computer games are often associated with. " TouchArcade wrote "Kitten Sanctuary is a very sweet game, but beyond that it's well-crafted, and the attention to detail shows. " AppSpy said "While this is definitely aimed at younger players and lovers of all things kitten, the match three is fun and you definitely get your share of virtual pets. " 148Apps said "Kitten Sanctuary doesn't reinvent the cheese wheel here (sorry), but the game successfully blends classic genres in an unexpected way that kept me playing far longer than I anticipated. It's a solid pick-up for casual gamers and cat ladies alike. "

References

2012 video games
Android (operating system) games
IOS games
MacOS games
Video games developed in the United Kingdom
Virtual pet video games
Windows games